Priit Tomson (November 3, 1942, Tallinn, 193 cm) is a retired Estonian professional basketball player, who competed for the Soviet Union.
He is the only Estonian basketball player who has won two gold medals at the World Championship. Tomson is a three-time Eurobasket champion with the Soviet Union national basketball team. He was a member of the youth and student teams of the Soviet Union in 1963–65 and the senior team in 1966–74 as a small forward. 
The highest-scoring player in the Estonian National Team throughout his long career.He was described as a basketball aristocrat, who was characterised by skilful operating in picking up offensive rebounds and accurate throwing from central positions and was often tasked with neutralising the opponents’ most dangerous players. Elected to the Hall of fame of Estonian basketball in 2010.

Club career 
Tomson's career started at the age of 18 in 1961 when he joined TPI basketball team (Tallinn Polytechnic Institute). After that he played for Kalev Tartu at the Championships of the Soviet Union in 1963–76 and for the Estonian National Team, which he captained from 1969.

Achievements

National Team 
 Olympic Games:   1968
 World Championships:  1967,
 1970,   1974
 European Championships:  1967,  1969,  1971

Club 
 Estonian SSR Championship: 1961-1966, 1979

References

Further reading

External links 
 Profile at sports-reference.com
 Profile at databaseOlympics.com

1942 births
Living people
Basketball players from Tallinn
Basketball players at the 1968 Summer Olympics
FIBA EuroBasket-winning players
Estonian men's basketball players
Olympic basketball players of the Soviet Union
Olympic bronze medalists for the Soviet Union
Olympic medalists in basketball
Soviet men's basketball players
1967 FIBA World Championship players
1970 FIBA World Championship players
1974 FIBA World Championship players
Medalists at the 1968 Summer Olympics
FIBA World Championship-winning players
Honoured Masters of Sport of the USSR
KK Kalev players
Tallinn University of Technology alumni